Puvan Raj  (born 29 August 2001) is a Singaporean professional footballer who plays as a forward for Balestier Khalsa.

Club

Balestier Khalsa
He made his debut against Young Lions.

Career statistics

Club

Notes

International statistics

References

2001 births
Living people
Singaporean footballers
Singaporean people of Tamil descent
Singaporean sportspeople of Indian descent
Association football defenders
Singapore Premier League players
Balestier Khalsa FC players